The meridian 130° west of Greenwich is a line of longitude that extends from the North Pole across the Arctic Ocean, North America, the Pacific Ocean, the Southern Ocean, and Antarctica to the South Pole.

The 130th meridian west forms a great circle with the 50th meridian east.

From Pole to Pole
Starting at the North Pole and heading south to the South Pole, the 130th meridian west passes through:

{| class="wikitable plainrowheaders"
! scope="col" width="130" | Co-ordinates
! scope="col" | Country, territory or sea
! scope="col" | Notes
|-
| style="background:#b0e0e6;" | 
! scope="row" style="background:#b0e0e6;" | Arctic Ocean
| style="background:#b0e0e6;" |
|-
| style="background:#b0e0e6;" | 
! scope="row" style="background:#b0e0e6;" | Beaufort Sea
| style="background:#b0e0e6;" |
|-valign="top"
| 
! scope="row" | 
| Northwest Territories Yukon — from  Northwest Territories — from  Yukon — from  British Columbia — from 
|-valign="top"
| 
! scope="row" | 
|-
| 
! scope="row" | 
| British Columbia — mainland, Pitt Island and Banks Island
|-valign="top"
| style="background:#b0e0e6;" | 
! scope="row" style="background:#b0e0e6;" | Pacific Ocean
| style="background:#b0e0e6;" | Passing just east of Pitcairn Island,  (at )
|-
| style="background:#b0e0e6;" | 
! scope="row" style="background:#b0e0e6;" | Southern Ocean
| style="background:#b0e0e6;" |
|-
| 
! scope="row" | Antarctica
| Unclaimed territory
|-
|}

See also
129th meridian west
131st meridian west

w130 meridian west